Leo Folla (born March 2, 1995) is an American soccer player who currently plays for Northern Colorado Hailstorm in USL League One.

Career

College and Amateur 
Folla started his college career at Iowa Western Community College in 2013 making 4 appearances. Folla had to leave early in the 2013 season due to personal family issues.

In 2014, Folla transferred to the University at Albany making 12 appearances.

Following the 2014 season, Folla transferred to St. Francis College Brooklyn in 2015 and played 3 years with the Terriers winning two Northeast Conference regular seasons and conference championships in 2016 and 2017 respectively.

From 2016-2018, Folla played three seasons with FA EURO in USL League Two.

Professional career 
In February 2018, Folla signed with Härnösands FF and made 4 appearances scoring 1 goal. Folla stayed for a brief stint after having to return to the United States due to visa complications.

On January 9, 2019, Folla signed with USL League One Expansion side Chattanooga Red Wolves.

On January 27, 2021, Folla moved to USL Championship side FC Tulsa.

Folla made the move to USL League One club Northern Colorado Hailstorm ahead of their inaugural season.

Personal 
Folla also holds Brazilian and Italian citizenship and was born and raised on Roosevelt Island.

References

External links
 
 

1995 births
Living people
Albany Great Danes men's soccer players
American soccer players
Association football defenders
Chattanooga Red Wolves SC players
F.A. Euro players
Soccer players from New York City
St. Francis Brooklyn Terriers men's soccer players
USL League One players
USL League Two players
Iowa Western Reivers men's soccer players
Härnösands FF players
Expatriate footballers in Sweden
American expatriate soccer players
American expatriate sportspeople in Sweden
FC Tulsa players
Lansdowne Yonkers FC players
Northern Colorado Hailstorm FC players